Poole is a civil parish in Cheshire East, England. It contains eight buildings that are recorded in the National Heritage List for England as designated listed buildings.  Of these, one is listed at Grade II*, the middle grade, and the others are at Grade II.  The parish is rural, and the listed buildings consist of a country house with an associated barn, farmhouses and farm buildings, a cottage, a bridge, a pinfold, and a chapel.

Key

Buildings

References

Citations

Sources

 

Listed buildings in the Borough of Cheshire East
Lists of listed buildings in Cheshire